Pablo Carreño Busta was the defending champion but chose not to participate.

Nicolás Kicker won the title after defeating Blaž Rola 2–6, 6–3, 6–0 in the final.

Seeds

Draw

Finals

Top half

Bottom half

References
Main Draw
Qualifying Draw

Blu Panorama Airlines Tennis Cup - Singles
2016 Singles